Krulewitch is a surname. Notable people with the surname include:

Melvin Krulewitch (1895–1978), American military officer and lawyer
Samuel Krulewitch (1871–1937), American politician